Howard George Hawkes (October 28, 1894 – May 15, 1970) was an American football and basketball coach.  He served the head football coach at Western Illinois University in Macomb, Illinois for four seasons, from 1922 to 1925, compiling a record of 14–15–2.  Hawkes was also the head basketball coach at Western Illinois from 1923 to 1926, tallying mark of 37–14.  A native of Windham, Maine, Hawkes graduated from Windham High School in 1911.  He received his B.P.E. degree from International Y.M.C.A. College at Springfield, Massachusetts in 1923.

Head coaching record

Football

References

External links
 

1894 births
1970 deaths
Basketball coaches from Maine
Western Illinois Leathernecks football coaches
Western Illinois Leathernecks men's basketball coaches
Springfield College (Massachusetts) alumni
People from Windham, Maine